Guillon may refer to:
Guillon, Yonne, a commune in Yonne, Burgundy, France
Roland Guillon (born 1942), French sociologist